Aanes is a Norwegian surname. Notable people with the surname include:

Fritz Aanes (born 1978), Norwegian Greco-Roman wrestler
Lene Aanes (born 1976), Norwegian sport wrestler

Norwegian-language surnames